Palappuram (Code: PLPM) is a railway station in Palappuram, Ottapalam, Palakkad district, Kerala and falls under the Palakkad railway division of the Southern Railway zone of the Indian Railways.

References

Railway stations in Palakkad district
Palakkad railway division